Grego is a surname. Notable people with the surname include:

 Antun Grego (born 1940), Croatian sailor
 Jim Grego (born 1955), American politician
 João Grego, 15th century Portuguese explorer
 Joseph Grego (1843–1908), English art collector
 Melania Grego (born 1973), Italian water polo player